Marlboro is an American brand of cigarettes owned by Philip Morris USA.

Malboro may also refer to the name of various geographical locations, frequently named after the town of Marlborough in Wiltshire, England:

Places

United States 
Alphabetical by state
 Marlboro, Burlington County, New Jersey
 Marlboro (CDP), New Jersey, in Cumberland County
 Marlboro Township, New Jersey, in Monmouth County
 Marlboro, New York
 Marlboro Mountains, a group of hogbacked mountains in New York
 Marlboro, Ohio
 Marlboro Township, Delaware County, Ohio
 Marlboro Township, Stark County, Ohio
 Marlboro County, South Carolina
 Marlboro, Vermont
 Marlboro College
 Marlboro Music School and Festival, an annual summer retreat
 Marlboro, Virginia

See also 
 Marlborough, Connecticut
 Upper Marlboro, Maryland
 Marlborough, Massachusetts
 Marlborough, Missouri
 Marlborough, New Hampshire
 Marlborough, New York
 Marlborough Township, Montgomery County, Pennsylvania

Other countries 
 Marlboro, Alberta, Canada
 Marlboro, Gauteng, a suburb of Sandton in South Africa
 Marlboro (Gautrain station), a rapid transit station

People 
 DJ Marlboro, Brazilian DJ
 Marlboro Packard (1828–1904), master shipbuilder

Other uses
 Marlboro College, located in Marlboro, Vermont
 Marlboro Man, a figure used in tobacco advertising campaigns for Malboro

See also
 Marlborough (disambiguation)